Johan Corné Greyling (born 21 June 1991) is a Namibian rugby union player, currently playing with the . He was named in Namibia's squad for the 2015 Rugby World Cup.

References

1991 births
Living people
Namibian rugby union players
Namibia international rugby union players
Falcons (rugby union) players
People from Okahandja
White Namibian people
Namibian people of British descent
Welwitschias players
Eastern Province Elephants players
Rugby union centres